"Everything Is Wrong" is a song by American rock band Interpol. It was released as the third single from their fifth studio album, El Pintor (2014), on April 18, 2015. The single was released on Record Store Day as a limited edition vinyl 7". A music video for the song was released on January 22, 2015. A remix of the song was later made by Bosnian DJ Solomun, which was released in April 2016. "Everything Is Wrong" peaked at No. 35 on the Billboard Alternative Songs chart and appeared on the soundtrack for MLB 15: The Show.

Music video
The official music video for "Everything Is Wrong" was released on January 22, 2015. It was co-directed by Carlos Puga and Interpol frontman Paul Banks. The video is centered on band members Banks, Daniel Kessler and Sam Fogarino as they walk throughout New York City on their way to a concert they will be playing at. While it shows Kessler and Fogarino acting nice towards other people, Banks is depicted as a more rude person who bothers others. Tom Breihan of Stereogum labeled Banks as "basically a Jeremy Renner character" in the video.

Release
Prior to its single release, the song was featured on the soundtrack for the video game MLB 15: The Show. "Everything Is Wrong" was released as a limited edition vinyl 7" as part of Record Store Day 2015. Only 4,000 copies of the single were made. The song was backed with "What Is What", a previously unreleased track. The artwork for the single was created by Shepard Fairey. A remix of the song was made by Bosnian DJ Solomun, which was released on April 29, 2016 by 2DIY4.

Track listing
 Matador – OLE-1081-7 – Record Store Day 7" vinyl single

 2DIY4 – 2DIY4-16 – 12" remixes single

Charts

References

2014 songs
2015 singles
Matador Records singles
Songs written by Paul Banks (American musician)
Songs written by Sam Fogarino
Songs written by Daniel Kessler (guitarist)